The International Tundra Experiment (ITEX) is a long-term international collaboration of researchers examining the responses of arctic and alpine plants and ecosystems to climate change. Researchers measure plant responses to standardized, small-scale passive warming, snow manipulations, and nutrient additions. Researchers use small open-top chambers (OTCs) to passively increase mean air temperature by 1-2 °C. The ITEX approach has been validated by tundra responses at the plot level. The network has published meta-analyses on plant phenology, growth, and reproduction, composition and abundance, and carbon flux. The ITEX network consists of more than 50 sites in polar and alpine locations around the world.

 Webpage
 List of common protocols and past papers
 Data analyses for ITEX can be linked here
 Recent (2022) special issue
 Interactive map of ITEX sites
 

Canadian sites

Alexandra Fiord, Ellesmere Island
Name of site leader(s): Greg Henry

University: University of British Columbia

Site elevation: 0-100m

Latitude (WGS84 decimal degrees): 78.8833° N

Longitude (WGS84 decimal degrees): 75.8000° W

Date site was established: 1987

Does your site have OTC's? Yes

Number of plots at your site (include OTCs control plots, etc.) 90 OTCs  99 controls

When were they established? 1993

Have they been closed? If so, when? No

Is there grazing at your site? No

Climate data: Air temperature, Soil temperature, Snow depth, Precipitation, Cloud cover, Wind, global radiation etc.

Current or past data collection: Phenology, Point framing, Above ground plant traits, Flower counts, Fertilizer plots, Snowmelt dates, Snow addition and removal, GIS data, Drones (https://arcticdrones.org/), Phenocams (GoPros etc.), Transplant experiments, Plot photos, Soil moisture, Soil sampling, Succession studies

Main genera in OTC plots: Dryas, Salix, Cassiope, Vaccinium, Sedges, Grasses, Rushes, Saxifraga, Equisetum, Poppy, Oxyria, Draba, Mosses/Lichens, Fungi

Other nearby related study sites on Ellesmere: Sverdrup Pass, Princess Marie Bay, Hot Weather Creek,

Sverdrup Pass, Ellesmere Island, Nunavut 
Name of site leader(s): Esther Lévesque,  Josef Svoboda (1986-1994)    

University: Université du Québec à Trois-Rivières (UQTR)  

Site elevation: 180 m

Latitude (WGS84 decimal degrees): 79.14  

Longitude (WGS84 decimal degrees):  -79.7  

Date site was established: 1990    

Does your site have OTC's?   No    

Number of plots at your site (include OTCs control plots, etc.) 13 in total along altitudinal gradients (300m to ca. 700m) on two substrates (granite and dolomite)    D1-D6 and G1-G7    

When were they established? 1990    

Have they been closed? If so, when? Yes, 1994  

Is there grazing at your site? Insects, Ungulates, Hares (Lagomorphs)    

Climate data: Air temperature >1m, Soil temperature, Precipitation    Soil temperature    year round (1986-1994)    

Current or past data collection: Individual plant phenology, Above ground plant traits, Flower counts (total), Flower counts (per stage)        

Main genera in plots: Papaver  
Citation: Lévesque, E., Henry, G.H.R., Svoboda, J., 1997. Phenological and growth responses of Papaver radicatum along altitudinal gradients in the Canadian High Arctic. Global Change Biology 3, 125–145. https://doi.org/10.1111/j.1365-2486.1997.gcb145.x

Bylot Island, Nunavut 
Name of site leader(s): Esther Lévesque  

University: Université du Québec à Trois-Rivières    

Latitude (WGS84 decimal degrees): 73.3652

Longitude (WGS84 decimal degrees): -79.0153

Nunatsiavut (Nain and Torr Bay) 
Name of site leader(s): Laura Siegwart Collier, Luise Hermanutz

University: Memorial University

Latitude (WGS84 decimal degrees): 58.4774° N

Longitude (WGS84 decimal degrees): 62.8295° W

Date site was established:2009

Nain   
Does your site have OTC's?  Yes

Number of plots at your site (include OTCs control plots, etc.) 18

When were they established? 2009

Have they been closed? If so, when? Yes, the subsite is closed

Is there grazing at your site?  No

Climate data:Air temperature >1m, Soil temperature, PAR, Soil moisture probe  

Current or past data collection:Point framing, Flower counts (total), Plot photos, Fruit production

Main genera in OTC plots:Betula, Vaccinium, Empetrum, Rhododendron, Carex, Bryophytes, Lichen

Torr Bay   
Does your site have OTC's? Yes

Number of plots at your site (include OTCs control plots, etc.) 60

When were they established? 2009

Have they been closed? If so, when? No but visited infrequently (once 3–5 years)

Is there grazing at your site?

Climate data: Air temperature >1m    Soil temperature, PAR, Soil moisture probe

Current or past data collection: Point framing, Flower counts (total), Fruit production

Main genera in OTC plots: Salix, Betula, Vaccinium, Empetrum, Rhododendron, Carex, Eriophorum, Poa, Juncus, Bryophytes, Lichen, Oxytropis

Tundra Ecosystem Research Station, Daring Lake 
Name of site leader(s): Karin Clark

University: Government of the Northwest Territories

Latitude (WGS84 decimal degrees): 65 degrees 52 min N

Longitude (WGS84 decimal degrees): 111 degrees 32 min W

Date site was established: 1995

Does your site have OTC's? Currently have

Number of plots at your site (include OTCs control plots, etc.) 9

When were they established? Plots established 1995; OTCs in 2000

Have they been closed? If so, when? No

Is there grazing at your site? Yes

Climate data: Air temperature, Soil temperature, Snow depth, Precipitation, radiation, wind speed and direction

Current or past data collection: Phenology, Point framing, Above ground plant traits, Flower counts, Snowmelt dates

Main genera in OTC plots: Salix, Betula, Vaccinium, Sedges, Saxifraga, Oxytropis

Qikiqtaruk (Herschel Island), Yukon 
Name of site leader(s): Isla Myers-Smith

University: University of Edinburgh, Yukon Parks

Site elevation: 70m

Latitude (WGS84 decimal degrees): 69.6 N

Longitude (WGS84 decimal degrees): 138.9 W

Date site was established: 1999

Does your site have OTC's? Never had

Number of plots at your site (include OTCs control plots, etc.) 12

When were they established? 1999

Have they been closed? If so, when?  No

Is there grazing at your site? Yes

Climate data: Air temperature, Soil temperature, Snow depth, Precipitation

Current or past data collection: Phenology, Point framing, Above ground plant traits, Herbivory, Flower counts, Plot photos, Snowmelt dates, GIS data, Drones (https://arcticdrones.org/), Phenocams (GoPros etc.), Soil sampling, Shrub common garden

Main genera in OTC plots: Dryas, Salix, Betula, Sedges, Grasses, Mosses/Lichens

Garibaldi Park, BC, Canada 
Name of site leader(s): Cassandra Elphinstone, Courtney Collins, Nathalie Chardon

University: University of British Columbia

Site elevation: 1470m

Latitude (WGS84 decimal degrees): 49.927275

Longitude (WGS84 decimal degrees): -122.992919

Date site was established: 2022

Does your site have OTC's? Yes

Number of plots at your site (include OTCs control plots, etc.) 24

When were they established? 2022

Have they been closed? If so, when? No

Is there grazing at your site? Yes

Climate data: Plot level Air temperature, Soil temperature, radiation

Current or past data collection: Phenology, Point framing, Above ground plant traits, Flower counts, Phenocams (GoPros etc.), Plot photos, Soil moisture, Soil sampling

Main genera in OTC plots: Salix, Cassiope, Phyllodoce, Kalmia, Triantha, Pinguicula, Equisetum, Carex

Greenlandic sites

Disko, Greenland 
Name of site leader(s):  Per Molgaard

University: Copenhagen

Site elevation: 10-100m

Latitude (WGS84 decimal degrees): 69.63N

Longitude (WGS84 decimal degrees): 42.17W

Date site was established: 1989 (last visit 2013)

Does your site have OTC's? No

Number of plots at your site (include OTCs control plots, etc.) 4

When were they established? 1992

Have they been closed? If so, when? Yes 1994

Is there grazing at your site? No

Climate data: Air temperature, Soil temperature, Snow depth, Precipitation

Current or past data collection: Phenology, Point framing, Above ground plant traits, Herbivory, Flower counts

Main genera in OTC plots: Salix, Papaver, Caterpillars on willow

Arctic Station, Disko, Greenland 
Name of site leader(s): Anders Michelsen, Bo Elberling

University: University of Copenhagen

Mesic-dry heath tundra 
Site elevation: 95m

Latitude (WGS84 decimal degrees): 69 16 N

Longitude (WGS84 decimal degrees): 53 27 W

Date site was established: 20Does your site have OTC's? Only snow fences

Number of plots at your site (include OTCs control plots, etc.) 48

When were they established? 2012

Have they been closed? If so, when? still running

Is there grazing at your site? Yes

Climate data: Air temperature, Soil temperature, Snow depth, Precipitation, Cloud cover

Current or past data collection: Point framing, Above ground plant traits, Below ground traits, Snow fences, Soil moisture, Drones, Soil sampling

Main genera in OTC plots: Dryas, Salix, Betula, Cassiope, Vaccinium, Sedges, Grasses, Mosses/Lichens

Wet sedge tundra 
Site elevation: 85m

Latitude (WGS84 decimal degrees): 69 26 N

Longitude (WGS84 decimal degrees): 53 47 W

Date site was established: 2013

Does your site have OTC's? Only snow fences

Number of plots at your site (include OTCs control plots, etc.) 48

When were they established? 2013

Have they been closed? If so, when? still running

Is there grazing at your site? Yes

Climate data: Air temperature, Soil temperature, Snow depth, Precipitation, Cloud cover

Current or past data collection: Point framing, Above ground plant traits, Below ground traits, Snow fences, Snowmelt dates, Soil moisture, Drones, Soil sampling

Main genera in OTC plots: Salix, Sedges, Rushes, Equisetum, Mosses/Lichens

Zackenberg, Greenland 
Name of site leader(s): Niels Martin Schmidt

University: Aarhus University

Site elevation: App. 55 m

Latitude (WGS84 decimal degrees): 74.47427

Longitude (WGS84 decimal degrees): -20.52895

Date site was established: 1996

Does your site have OTC's? Currently have

Number of plots at your site (include OTCs control plots, etc.) 20

When were they established? 2007

Have they been closed? If so, when? No

Is there grazing at your site? Yes

Climate data: Air temperature, Soil temperature, Snow depth, Precipitation, Cloud cover

Current or past data collection: Phenology, Point framing, Flower counts, Plot photos, Snowmelt dates, Soil moisture, Soil sampling

Main genera in OTC plots: Salix, Cassiope, Vaccinium, Grasses, Mosses/Lichens

Zackenberg, Greenland 
Name of site leader(s): Anders Michelsen

University: University of Copenhagen

Site elevation: 35m

Latitude (WGS84 decimal degrees): 74 30 N

Longitude (WGS84 decimal degrees): 21 00 W

Date site was established: 2004

Does your site have OTC's? Yes

Number of plots at your site (include OTCs control plots, etc.) 20

When were they established? 2004

Have they been closed? If so, when?

Is there grazing at your site? Yes

Climate data: Air temperature, Soil temperature, Snow depth, Precipitation

Current or past data collection: Point framing, Snowmelt dates, Soil moisture

Main genera in OTC plots: Dryas, Salix, Cassiope, Vaccinium, Grasses, Mosses/Lichens

Kobbefjord (Nuuk), Greenland 
Name of site leader(s): Katrine Raundrup

University: Greenland Institute of Natural Resources

Site elevation: 27 m

Latitude (WGS84 decimal degrees): 64.137147

Longitude (WGS84 decimal degrees): -51.379999

Date site was established: 2008

Does your site have OTC's? Yes

Number of plots at your site (include OTCs control plots, etc.) 30

When were they established? 2008

Have they been closed? If so, when?  No

Is there grazing at your site? No

Climate data: Air temperature, Soil temperature, Snow depth, Precipitation, Cloud cover

Current or past data collection: Phenology, Above ground plant traits, Flower counts, Plot photos, Snowmelt dates, Soil moisture, GIS data, Soil sampling

Main genera in OTC plots: Salix, Sedges, Grasses, Mosses/Lichens, Empetrum

Kangerlussuaq, Greenland 
Name of site leader(s): Eric Post

University: University of California, Davis

Site elevation: 200m

Latitude (WGS84 decimal degrees): 67.017

Longitude (WGS84 decimal degrees): -50.717

Date site was established: 2003

Does your site have OTC's? Yes

Subsites: KANGER.DOC, KANGER.DOPEY, KANGER.BASHFUL

European sites

Auðkúluheiði, Iceland 
Name of site leader(s): Ingibjörg S. Jónsdóttir

University: University of Iceland and University Centre in Svalbard

Site elevation: 450m

Latitude (WGS84 decimal degrees): 65°12'0" N

Longitude (WGS84 decimal degrees): 19°42'0" W

Date site was established: 1996

Does your site have OTC's? Yes

Number of plots at your site (include OTCs control plots, etc.) 30

When were they established? 1996

Have they been closed? If so, when?  No

Is there grazing at your site? Yes

Climate data: Air temperature, Soil temperature, Precipitation, Total radiation, PAR

Current or past data collection: Phenology, Point framing, Above ground plant traits, Herbivory, Flower counts, Plot photos, Snowmelt dates, Soil moisture, Soil sampling

Main genera in OTC plots: Dryas, Salix, Betula, Vaccinium, Sedges, Grasses, Rushes, Equisetum, Silene, Cerastium, Mosses/Lichens, Empetrum

Landmannahellir/Löðmundarvatn at Fjallabak, Iceland 
Name of site leader(s): Ólafur S. Andrésson 2017–present,  Alejandro Salazar 2017-2019

University: University of Iceland, Faculty of Life and Environmental Sciences

Site elevation: 600m  

Latitude (WGS84 decimal degrees): 64.0364

Longitude (WGS84 decimal degrees): 19.219017

Date site was established:  2017  

Does your site have OTC's? Yes

Number of plots at your site (include OTCs control plots, etc.)  16

When were they established? 2018

Have they been closed? If so, when? No

Is there grazing at your site? Ungulates, Birds

Climate data: Soil temperature, Snowmelt date,

Current or past data collection:  Soil moisture probe, Vegetation cover, microbial composition, soil respiration, N fixation, Plot photos, Below ground microbe surveys, CO2 Flux, Lichen cover, Bryophyte cover, Litter bags, Soil (chemical nutrient composition), N fixation (ARA), cyanobacteria cover on biocrust, soil respiration

Main genera in OTC plots: Salix, Empetrum, Carex, Bryophytes, Lichen, Liverwort (Anthelia) biocrust is the primary research subject and main ground cover (followed by moss).

Billefjorden, Svalbard 
Name of site leader(s): Petr Macek

University: University of South Bohemia

Site elevation: 70m

Latitude (WGS84 decimal degrees): 78.5304

Longitude (WGS84 decimal degrees):  16.3070

Date site was established: 2014

Does your site have OTC's? Yes

Number of plots at your site (include OTCs control plots, etc.) 30

When were they established? 2015

Have they been closed? If so, when? 

Is there grazing at your site? Yes

Climate data: Air temperature, Soil temperature, Precipitation, leaf temperatures

Current or past data collection: Plant cover (%), Above ground plant traits, Herbivory, Flower counts, Plot photos, Snowmelt dates, Soil moisture, Soil sampling

Main genera in OTC plots: Dryas, Salix, Cassiope, Sedges, Grasses, Rushes, Saxifraga, Equisetum, Silene, Cerastium, Oxyria, Mosses/Lichens

AWS1, Svalbard 
Name of site leader(s):Petr Macek

University:University of South Bohemia

Site elevation:50

Latitude (WGS84 decimal degrees):78.717

Longitude (WGS84 decimal degrees):16.445

Date site was established: 2014

Does your site have OTC's?OTCs, Herbivory exclosure, Seeding experiments

Number of plots at your site (include OTCs control plots, etc.) 50

When were they established? 2015  

Have they been closed? If so, when? No

Is there grazing at your site?Ungulates, Birds

Climate data:Air temperature >1m, Soil temperature

Current or past data collection: Individual plant phenology, Snapshot phenology, Above ground plant traits, Flower counts (total), Plot photos, Transplant experiments, Plant abundance measure (other than point framing), Lichen cover, Bryophyte cover, Plant tissue nutrient composition, Litter bags    Reciprocal transplant experiment, Dark diversity (species richness)

Main genera in OTC plots:Dryas, Salix, Carex, Saxifraga, Silene, Cerastium, Oxyria, Draba, Equisetum, Bryophytes

Adventdalen, Svalbard 
Name of site leader(s): Elisabeth J Cooper

University: UiT The Arctic University of Norway

Site elevation: 50

Latitude (WGS84 decimal degrees):78.16

Longitude (WGS84 decimal degrees): 16.1  

Date site was established: 2007  

Does your site have OTC's? OTCs, Snow fences, Snow removal

When were they established? 2007

Have they been closed? If so, when? Yes, 2015

Sub-sites: Heath, Meadow

Endalen, Svalbard 
Name of site leader(s): Ingibjorg Jonsdottir

University: University of Iceland and University Centre in Svalbard

Site elevation:   100  m

Latitude (WGS84 decimal degrees): 78.187445

Longitude (WGS84 decimal degrees): 15.75835

Date site was established: 2002

Does your site have OTC's?  Yes    OTCs

Sub-sites: Dryas Heath, Cassiope Low, Cassiope High,  Fellfield, Snowbed Low, Snowbed High

Faroe Islands 
Name of site leader(s): Magnus Gaard, Anna Maria Fosaa

University: University of the Faroe Islands

Site elevation: 600 m

Latitude (WGS84 decimal degrees): 62.0667

Longitude (WGS84 decimal degrees): -6.95

Date site was established:   2001

Does your site have OTC's?     Yes

Knutshø, Dovre, Norway 
Name of site leader(s): Annika Hofgaard

University: Norwegian Institute for Nature Research (NINA)

Site elevation: 1050-1150m

Latitude (WGS84 decimal degrees): 62 18' N

Longitude (WGS84 decimal degrees): 09 37' E

Date site was established: 1998

Does your site have OTC's? Yes

Number of plots at your site (include OTCs control plots, etc.) 3

When were they established? 1998

Have they been closed? If so, when? 

Is there grazing at your site? Yes

Climate data: No, two year of air and soil temperature data (ambient and OTC) at the start of site use

Current or past data collection: Above ground plant traits, Herbivory, Plot photos, plant cover (%)

Main genera in OTC plots: Salix, Betula, Vaccinium, Sedges, Grasses, Rushes, Equisetum, Mosses/Lichens, Empetrum, Astragalus and a number of other dwarf shrubs and herbs

Finse, Norway 
Name of site leader(s): Kari Klanderud

University: Norwegian University of Life Sciences

Site elevation: 1500 m asl

Latitude (WGS84 decimal degrees): 60.6051° N

Longitude (WGS84 decimal degrees): 7.5046° E

Date site was established: June 2000

Does your site have OTC's? Yes

Number of plots at your site (include OTCs control plots, etc.) 40 OTCs 40 controls

When were they established? 2000

Have they been closed? If so, when? No

Is there grazing at your site? Yes

Climate data: Air temperature, Precipitation, Done by climate station at Finse (1200 m asl)

Current or past data collection: Above ground plant traits, Flower counts, Plot photos, Soil moisture, Soil sampling, Vegetation analyses by sub plot frequencies and % cover

Main genera in OTC plots: Dryas, Sedges, Grasses, Silene, Mosses/Lichens

Kilpisjärvi Finland 
Name of site leader(s): Anne Tolvanen

University: Natural Resources Institute Finland

Site elevation: 670 m a.s.l.

Latitude (WGS84 decimal degrees): 69.4N

Longitude (WGS84 decimal degrees): 20.490E

Date site was established: 01.06.1994

Does your site have OTC's? Currently have

Number of plots at your site (include OTCs control plots, etc.) 20

When were they established? 1994

Have they been closed? If so, when? running experiment

Is there grazing at your site? Yes, factorial simulated herbivory treatment.

Climate data: Air temperature, Soil temperature

Current or past data collection: Point framing, Herbivory, Soil sampling, GHG fluxes, plant C/N concentrations, soil microbial communities

Main genera in OTC plots: Salix, Betula, Vaccinium, Rushes, Mosses/Lichens

Kilpisjärvi Finland II 
Name of site leader(s): Friederike Gehrmann

University: University of Helsinki

Site elevation: 700m

Latitude (WGS84 decimal degrees): 69.0443

Longitude (WGS84 decimal degrees): 20.8033

Date site was established: 2014

Does your site have OTC's? Never had

Number of plots at your site (include OTCs control plots, etc.) 24

When were they established? 2014

Have they been closed? If so, when?  No

Is there grazing at your site? Yes

Climate data: Air temperature, Soil temperature

Current or past data collection: Phenology, Snowmelt dates, Soil moisture, ecophysiology

Main genera in OTC plots: Salix, Betula, Cassiope, Vaccinium, Saxifraga, Silene

Latnjajaure, Sweden 
Name of site leader(s): Robert Bjork and Mats Bjorkman

University: Göteborg University

Site elevation: 981 m

Latitude (WGS84 decimal degrees): 68.21N

Longitude (WGS84 decimal degrees): 18.31E

Date site was established: 1990 (First full ITEX year 1993)

Does your site have OTC's? Yes

Number of plots at your site (include OTCs control plots, etc.) 50 plots (in 5 plant communities)

When were they established? 1993, 1994, 1996

Have they been closed? If so, when?

Is there grazing at your site? Yes

Climate data: Air temperature, Soil temperature, Snow depth, Precipitation, Cloud cover, Wind, global radiation etc.

Current or past data collection: Phenology, Point framing, Above ground plant traits, Herbivory, Flower counts, Plot photos, Fertilizer plots, Snowmelt dates, Soil moisture, Soil sampling, soil fauna, soil parameters

Main genera in OTC plots: Dryas, Salix, Betula, Cassiope, Vaccinium, Sedges, Grasses, Rushes, Saxifraga, Equisetum, Silene, Cerastium, Oxyria, Draba, Mosses/Lichens, many mosses and lichens determined to species of genera level

Paddus, Abisko, Sweden 
Name of site leader(s): Anders Michelsen

University: University of Copenhagen

(mesic tree-line heath) 
Site elevation: 550m

Latitude (WGS84 decimal degrees): 68 19 N

Longitude (WGS84 decimal degrees): 18 51 E

Date site was established: 1989

Does your site have OTC's? Yes

Number of plots at your site (include OTCs control plots, etc.) 48

When were they established? 1989

Have they been closed? If so, when?

Is there grazing at your site? No

Climate data: Air temperature, Soil temperature

Current or past data collection: Phenology, Point framing, Above ground plant traits, Below ground traits, Herbivory, Flower counts, Fertilizer plots, Soil moisture, Soil sampling

Main genera in OTC plots: Dryas, Salix, Betula, Cassiope, Vaccinium, Sedges, Grasses, Equisetum, Silene, Mosses/Lichens

Substrate (graminoid-rich heath) 
Site elevation: 560m

Latitude (WGS84 decimal degrees): 68 19 N

Longitude (WGS84 decimal degrees): 18 50 E

Date site was established: 2012

Does your site have OTC's? Yes

Number of plots at your site (include OTCs control plots, etc.) 30

When were they established? 2012

Have they been closed? If so, when?

Is there grazing at your site? Yes

Climate data: Air temperature, Soil temperature

Current or past data collection: Phenology, Point framing, Above ground plant traits, Below ground traits, Fertilizer plots, Soil moisture, Soil sampling

Main genera in OTC plots: Salix, Betula, Vaccinium, Sedges, Grasses, Rushes, Equisetum, Mosses/Lichens

Multe (wet heath) 
Site elevation: 430m

Latitude (WGS84 decimal degrees): 68 20 N

Longitude (WGS84 decimal degrees): 18 49 E

Date site was established: 1999

Does your site have OTC's? Yes

Number of plots at your site (include OTCs control plots, etc.) 30

When were they established? 1999

Have they been closed? If so, when? 

Is there grazing at your site? No

Climate data: Air temperature, Soil temperature

Current or past data collection: Phenology, Point framing, Above ground plant traits, Below ground traits, Fertilizer plots, Soil moisture, Soil sampling

Main genera in OTC plots: Salix, Betula, Vaccinium, Sedges, Grasses, Rushes, Equisetum, Mosses/Lichens

Forest (understory in open birch forest) 
Site elevation: 430m

Latitude (WGS84 decimal degrees): 68 20 N

Longitude (WGS84 decimal degrees): 18 50 E

Date site was established: 2009

Does your site have OTC's? Yes

Number of plots at your site (include OTCs control plots, etc.) 10

When were they established? 2009

Have they been closed? If so, when?

Is there grazing at your site? No

Climate data: Air temperature, Soil temperature

Current or past data collection: Point framing, Above ground plant traits, Below ground traits, Soil moisture, Soil sampling

Main genera in OTC plots: Vaccinium, Grasses, Mosses/Lichens

Abisko Torneträsk treeline, Sweden 
Name of site leader(s): Ellen Dorrepaal

University: Umeå University

Site elevation: 570-775 masl

Latitude (WGS84 decimal degrees): N68°18'-N68°31

Longitude (WGS84 decimal degrees): E18°12'-E18°54'

Date site was established: 2011

Does your site have OTC's? Currently have

Number of plots at your site (include OTCs control plots, etc.) 96

When were they established? 2011

Have they been closed? If so, when? NA

Is there grazing at your site? Yes

Climate data: Air temperature, Soil temperature, Snow depth, Precipitation, Soil moisture

Current or past data collection: Point framing, Above ground plant traits, Soil moisture, Transplant experiments, Nutrients; (Transplanted) seedling survival; Experiment includes OTCs and moss removal treatments for vegetation dominated by three different moss species, across 8 sites along a precipitation gradient

Main genera in OTC plots: Salix, Betula, Vaccinium, Sedges, Grasses, Mosses/Lichens, Empetrum; In general very variable, since the experiment includes 8 sites (one replicate per site) and 3 dominant moss species per site

Arvidsjaur, Sweden - forest fire chronosequence 
Name of site leader(s): Ellen Dorrepaal

University: Umeå University

Site elevation: 424-522 masl

Latitude (WGS84 decimal degrees): N65°35'-N66°07'

Longitude (WGS84 decimal degrees): E17°15'-E19°26'

Date site was established: 2010

Does your site have OTC's? Currently have

Number of plots at your site (include OTCs control plots, etc.) 80

When were they established? 2010

Have they been closed? If so, when? NA

Is there grazing at your site? Yes

Climate data: Air temperature, Soil temperature, Soil moisture

Current or past data collection: Point framing, Above ground plant traits, Below ground traits, Soil moisture, Soil sampling, Transplant experiments, Soil nutrients; Nematodes; Microbial community (PLFA); (Transplanted) seedling survival; Litter decomposition; Experiment consists of OTC x moss removal x shrub removal (full factorial) across 10 sites with varying fire history in the northern boreal forest (Pine/Spruce/Birch), with one treatment replicate per site

Main genera in OTC plots: Vaccinium, Mosses/Lichens, Empetrum

Gavia Pass I, Italy 
Name of site leader(s): Michele Carbognani

University: Parma (Italy)

Site elevation: 2700 m

Latitude (WGS84 decimal degrees): 46.3404

Longitude (WGS84 decimal degrees): 10.4986

Date site was established: 2008

Does your site have OTC's? Currently have

Number of plots at your site (include OTCs control plots, etc.) 20

When were they established? 2008

Have they been closed? If so, when? No

Is there grazing at your site? No

Climate data: Air temperature, Soil temperature

Current or past data collection: Phenology, Point framing, Above ground plant traits, Flower counts, Plot photos, Snowmelt dates, Soil moisture, litter decomposition

Main genera in OTC plots: Salix, Cerastium, Mosses/Lichens, Veronica, Cardamine, Poa, Leucanthemopsis

Gavia Pass II, Italy 
Name of site leader(s): Alessandro Petraglia

University: Parma (Italy)

Site elevation: 2700 m

Latitude (WGS84 decimal degrees): 46.3404

Longitude (WGS84 decimal degrees): 10.4986

Date site was established: 2012

Does your site have OTC's? Currently have

Number of plots at your site (include OTCs control plots, etc.) 18

When were they established? 2012

Have they been closed? If so, when? No

Is there grazing at your site? No

Climate data: Air temperature, Soil temperature, Precipitation, PAR

Current or past data collection: Phenology, Point framing, Flower counts, Snow addition and removal, Snowmelt dates, Soil moisture

Main genera in OTC plots: Salix, Cerastium, Mosses/Lichens, Veronica, Cardamine, Poa, Leucathemopsis

Foscagno Pass, Italy 
Name of site leader(s): Nicoletta Cannone

University: Università dell'Insubria

Site elevation: 2250-2550m

Latitude (WGS84 decimal degrees): 46.04 N

Longitude (WGS84 decimal degrees): 10.02

Date site was established: 2007

Does your site have OTC's? Never had

Number of plots at your site (include OTCs control plots, etc.) 100

When were they established? 2007

Have they been closed? If so, when? running experiment

Is there grazing at your site? No

Climate data: Air temperature, Soil temperature, Precipitation, Snow depth and snow melting

Current or past data collection: Phenology, Above ground plant traits, Flower counts, Plot photos, Fertilizer plots, Snowmelt dates, GIS data, Vegetation data (composition and % coverage)

Main genera in OTC plots: Salix, Vaccinium, Sedges, Grasses, Saxifraga, Silene, Cerastium, Oxyria, Mosses/Lichens

Stelvio Pass, Italy 
Name of site leader(s): Nicoletta Cannone

University: Università dell'Insubria

Site elevation: 2700m

Latitude (WGS84 decimal degrees): 46.31 N

Longitude (WGS84 decimal degrees): 10.25 E

Date site was established: 2014

Does your site have OTC's? Currently have

Number of plots at your site (include OTCs control plots, etc.) 120

When were they established? 2014

Have they been closed? If so, when? running experiment

Is there grazing at your site? No

Climate data: Air temperature, Soil temperature, Snow depth, Precipitation, Snow melting dates

Current or past data collection: Phenology, Above ground plant traits, Flower counts, Plot photos, Snow fences, Fertilizer plots, Snowmelt dates, Soil moisture, GIS data, Soil sampling, Vegetation analyses (composition and % cover)

Main genera in OTC plots: Salix, Sedges, Grasses, Mosses/Lichens

Val Bercla, Switzerland 
Name of site leader(s): Christian Rixen

University * WSL Institute for Snow and Avalanche Research SLF

Site elevation 2500m

Latitude (WGS84 decimal degrees) 46.47

Longitude (WGS84 decimal degrees) 9.58

Date site was established 1994

Does your site have OTC's? Currently have

Number of plots at your site (include OTC's control plots, etc.) 9

When were they established? 1994

Have they been closed? If so, when? No OTCs from 1987-2008

Is there grazing at your site? Yes

Does your site collect climate data? If yes, what type? No climate station directly at site but in the general area. Air temperature, Soil temperature, Snow depth, Precipitation, Cloud cover

Current or past data collection at your site:Phenology, Above ground plant traits, Herbivory, Plot photos, Abundance estimates

Main genera in OTC plots: Salix, Sedges, Grasses, Saxifraga, Silene, Mosses/Lichens

Stillberg snow manipulation experiment, Switzerland 
Name of site leader(s): Sonja Wipf and Christian Rixen

University: WSL-Institute for Snow and Avalanche Research SLF

Site elevation: 2220 m

Latitude (WGS84 decimal degrees): 46.77224  

Longitude (WGS84 decimal degrees):  9.86569  

Date site was established: 2003  

Does your site have OTC's?  No  Snow removal          

Number of plots at your site (include OTCs control plots, etc.) 21

When were they established? 2004

Have they been closed? If so, when? No but since 2006 maintained with minimal effort (snow manipulation done, not many measurements). Vegetation does not show much response.

Is there grazing at your site?  No

Climate data: Air temperature >1m, Soil temperature, Snow depth, Snowmelt date, Precipitation, PAR, Wind speed, Wind direction, Solar radiation, Weather station <500m away

Current or past data collection:  Individual plant phenology, Plot photos, Plant abundance measure (other than point framing), Lichen cover, Bryophyte cover, Litter bags, Individual growth

Main genera in OTC plots: Vaccinium, Empetrum, Rhododendron, Carex, Loiseleuria, Helictotrichum

Jakobshorn, Davos, Switzerland 
Name of site leader(s): Janet Prevey

University: Pacific Northwest Research Station

Site elevation: 2320 m

Latitude (WGS84 decimal degrees): 46.77

Longitude (WGS84 decimal degrees): 9.86      

Date site was established: 2014

Pyrenees, Spain 
Name of site leader(s): Estela Illa Bachs, Benjamin Komak, Olivier Argagnon and Ludovic Olicard

University:Universitat de Barcelona

Ulldeter     
Site elevation: 2400 m

Latitude (WGS84 decimal degrees): 42.41926

Longitude (WGS84 decimal degrees): 2.24756  

Date site was established: 2018  

Does your site have OTC's?Yes    

Number of plots at your site (include OTCs control plots, etc.) 8    

When were they established?2019

Have they been closed? If so, when?

Is there grazing at your site? No    

Climate data:Air temperature >1m, Snow depth, Precipitation, Wind speed, Solar radiation, Air temperature (near ground, ~10 cm), Snowmelt date

Current or past data collection:  Snapshot phenology, Point framing, Above ground plant traits, Plot photos, Plant tissue nutrient composition, Soil (physical texture), Soil (chemical nutrient composition), Species Abundance and Phenology

Main genera in OTC plots: Salix, Poa, Agrostis, Gentiana, Nardus, Trifolium

Ratera     
Site elevation: 2560 m

Latitude (WGS84 decimal degrees): 42.6053  

Longitude (WGS84 decimal degrees):  0.96021  

Date site was established:   2016

Does your site have OTC's? Yes

Number of plots at your site (include OTCs control plots, etc.) 8  

When were they established? 2017  

Have they been closed? If so, when?  No  

Is there grazing at your site? Ungulates

Climate data: Air temperature (near ground, ~10 cm), Snowmelt date

Current or past data collection: Point framing, Above ground plant traits, Plot photos, Plant tissue nutrient composition, Soil (physical texture), Soil (chemical nutrient composition)    Species Abundance and Phenology

Main genera in OTC plots: Salix, Carex, Poa, Bryophytes, Agrostis, Nardus

Envalira          
Site elevation: 2500 m

Latitude (WGS84 decimal degrees): 42.52372

Longitude (WGS84 decimal degrees): 1.73507

Date site was established: 2017  

Does your site have OTC's?Yes  

Number of plots at your site (include OTCs control plots, etc.) 8  

When were they established? 2017

Have they been closed? If so, when? No

Is there grazing at your site? No

Climate data: Air temperature (near ground, ~10 cm)

Current or past data collection: Point framing, Above ground plant traits, Plot photos, Plant tissue nutrient composition, Soil (physical texture), Soil (chemical nutrient composition)    Species Abundance and Phenology

Main genera in OTC plots:  Salix, Carex, Poa, Agrostis, Gentiana, Nardus, Sibbaldia

Arrious     
Site elevation: 2370 m

Latitude (WGS84 decimal degrees): 42.84143  

Longitude (WGS84 decimal degrees): -0.33682  

Date site was established: 2017  

Does your site have OTC's? Yes

Number of plots at your site (include OTCs control plots, etc.) 8    

When were they established? 2017        

Have they been closed? If so, when? No

Is there grazing at your site? Unknown

Climate data: Air temperature (near ground, ~10 cm), Snowmelt date

Current or past data collection: Point framing, Above ground plant traits, Plant tissue nutrient composition, Soil (physical texture), Soil (chemical nutrient composition)    Species Abundance and Phenology

Main genera in OTC plots: Salix, Festuca, Gentiana, Trifolium

Cataperdís (Andorra), Spain 
Name of site leader(s): Estela Illa Bachs, Benjamin Komak, Empar Carrillo Ortuño, Josep Maria Ninot Sugrañes, Alba Anadon Rosell, Aaron Pérez Haase, and Oriol Grau Fernández

University: Universitat de Barcelona

Site elevation: 2535 m

Latitude (WGS84 decimal degrees):  42.61678

Longitude (WGS84 decimal degrees): 1.48186

Date site was established: 2017  

Does your site have OTC's? Yes

Number of plots at your site (include OTCs control plots, etc.) 16  

When were they established?  2019      

Have they been closed? If so, when?  No

Is there grazing at your site? No

Climate data: Air temperature (near ground, ~10 cm), Snowmelt date

Current or past data collection: Point framing, Above ground plant traits, Plot photos, Below ground microbe surveys, Plant tissue nutrient composition, Litter bags, Soil (physical texture), Soil (chemical nutrient composition), Species Abundance and Phenology, OTCs, Snow removal     

Main genera in OTC plots: Salix, Poa, Bryophytes, Lichen, Sibbaldia, Leontodon (= Scorzoneroides)

Asian sites

Alpine tundra of the Changbai Mountains, Northeast China 
Name of site leader(s):Shengwei Zong , Hongshi He; 2015-ongoing, Zhengfang Wu; 2009-ongoing, Haibo Du; 2009-ongoing, and Xu Jiawei; 2008-ongoing

University: Northeast Normal University

Site elevation: 2300 m

Latitude (WGS84 decimal degrees): 72  

Longitude (WGS84 decimal degrees): 42  

Date site was established: 2009  

Does your site have OTC's? Yes OTCs and Fertilizer (2013), Snow removal (2019), Vegetation removal (2018)

Number of plots at your site (include OTCs control plots, etc.)128

When were they established? 2011    

Have they been closed? If so, when? No

Is there grazing at your site? No

Climate data: Air temperature >1m, Soil temperature, Precipitation, Solar radiation, Wind speed, Wind direction, Soil moisture probe

Current or past data collection: Above ground plant traits, Plot photos, Plant abundance measure (other than point framing), Above ground biomass harvest, Below ground biomass harvest, Soil (physical texture), Soil (chemical nutrient composition)    Fine-scale geospatial data (GPS points for each plot), Drone images, Phenocams of site (GoPros etc.), Reciprocal transplant experiment  

Main genera in OTC plots: Dryas, Salix, Vaccinium, Rhododendron, Carex, Festuca, Poa, Juncus, Oxyria, Lycopodium, Bryophytes, Lichen, Oxytropis

American sites

Barrow/Utqiagvik & Atqasuk 
Name of site leader(s): Christian Bay 1994-1995, Patrick Webber 1995-2007, Robert Hollister 2007-current

University: Grand Valley State University

Barrow/Utqiagvik Dry Site   
Site elevation: 5m

Latitude (WGS84 decimal degrees): 71.31502696

Longitude (WGS84 decimal degrees): -156.6010247

Date site was established:  1994

Does your site have OTC's?    Yes    OTCs  

Number of plots at your site (include OTCs control plots, etc.) 48  

When were they established?  1994        

Have they been closed? If so, when? No

Is there grazing at your site? Insects, Rodents, Birds  

Climate data: Air temperature 10 cm, Air temperature >1m, Soil temperature, Snowmelt date, Precipitation, PAR, Wind speed, Wind direction, Soil moisture probe, Active layer depth

Current or past data collection: Plot level phenology, Individual plant phenology, Snapshot phenology, Point framing, Above ground plant traits, Below ground plant traits, Flower counts (total), Flower counts (per stage), Plot photos, Phenocams (GoPros etc.), Transplant experiments, Multispectral data, CO2 Flux, Methane Flux, Plant abundance measure (other than point framing), Lichen cover, Bryophyte cover, Plant tissue nutrient composition, Above ground biomass harvest, Below ground biomass harvest, Litter bags    Fine-scale geospatial data (GPS points for each plot), Drone images, Multispectral data, Phenocams of site (GoPros etc.), Reciprocal transplant experiment, Dark diversity (species richness), Taxonomic classification of bryophytes

Main genera in OTC plots: Salix, Cassiope, Carex, Eriophorum, Poa, Saxifraga, Cerastium, Stellaria, Papaver, Draba, Bryophytes, Lichen

Barrow/Utqiagvik Wet Site     
Site elevation: 3 m

Latitude (WGS84 decimal degrees): 71.31051842  

Longitude (WGS84 decimal degrees):  -156.5978987

Date site was established:  1995

Does your site have OTC's? Yes    OTCs     

Number of plots at your site (include OTCs control plots, etc.)   48  

When were they established?   1995      

Have they been closed? If so, when? No

Is there grazing at your site? Insects, Rodents, Birds      

Climate data: Air temperature 10 cm, Soil temperature, Snowmelt date, Soil moisture probe, Active layer depth  

Current or past data collection: Plot level phenology, Individual plant phenology, Snapshot phenology, Point framing, Above ground plant traits, Flower counts (total), Flower counts (per stage), Plot photos, Phenocams (GoPros etc.), Multispectral data, CO2 Flux, Plant abundance measure (other than point framing), Lichen cover, Bryophyte cover, Litter bags    Fine-scale geospatial data (GPS points for each plot), Drone images, Multispectral data, Phenocams of site (GoPros etc.), Dark diversity (species richness), Taxonomic classification of bryophytes

Main genera in OTC plots: Salix, Carex, Eriophorum, Poa, Saxifraga, Cerastium, Stellaria, Draba, Cardamine, Bryophytes

Atqasuk Dry Site                               
Site elevation: 22 m

Latitude (WGS84 decimal degrees):  70.45373011  

Longitude (WGS84 decimal degrees):  -157.4073879

Date site was established:  1996  

Does your site have OTC's? Yes  

Number of plots at your site (include OTCs control plots, etc.)  48

When were they established?    1996  

Have they been closed? If so, when?

Is there grazing at your site?  Insects, Ungulates, Rodents, Birds

Climate data: Air temperature 10 cm, Air temperature >1m, Soil temperature, Snowmelt date, Precipitation, PAR, Wind speed, Wind direction, Soil moisture probe, Active layer depth  

Current or past data collection:Plot level phenology, Individual plant phenology, Snapshot phenology, Point framing, Above ground plant traits, Flower counts (total), Flower counts (per stage), Plot photos, Phenocams (GoPros etc.), Multispectral data, CO2 Flux, Plant abundance measure (other than point framing), Lichen cover, Bryophyte cover, Plant tissue nutrient composition, Above ground biomass harvest, Litter bags    Fine-scale geospatial data (GPS points for each plot), Drone images, Multispectral data, Phenocams of site (GoPros etc.), Dark diversity (species richness), Taxonomic classification of bryophytes

Main genera in OTC plots: Salix, Cassiope, Vaccinium, Carex, Poa, Bryophytes, Lichen

Atqasuk Wet Site                                                                                                                                
Site elevation: 17 m

Latitude (WGS84 decimal degrees): 70.45303348

Longitude (WGS84 decimal degrees):  -157.4003018

Date site was established:   1996  

Does your site have OTC's? Yes

Number of plots at your site (include OTCs control plots, etc.)  48  

When were they established?  1996      

Have they been closed? If so, when? No

Is there grazing at your site? Insects, Ungulates, Rodents  

Climate data: Air temperature 10 cm, Soil temperature, Snowmelt date, Soil moisture probe, Active layer depth    Air temperature (near ground, ~10 cm), Soil temperature, Snowmelt date, Soil moisture probe, Active layer depth

Current or past data collection:  Plot level phenology, Individual plant phenology, Snapshot phenology, Point framing, Above ground plant traits, Flower counts (total), Flower counts (per stage), Plot photos, Phenocams (GoPros etc.), Multispectral data, CO2 Flux, Lichen cover, Bryophyte cover, Litter bags    Fine-scale geospatial data (GPS points for each plot), Drone images, Multispectral data, Phenocams of site (GoPros etc.), Dark diversity (species richness), Taxonomic classification of bryophytes

Main genera in OTC plots: Salix, Betula, Carex, Eriophorum, Bryophytes, Lichen

Toolik and surrounding area (Shaver) 
Name of site leader(s): GR Shaver

University:  Ecosystems Center, MBL

Subsites: Toolik Historic Site, Imnavait Sites, ARC LTER sites - many local sites and experiments, all within about 25 km of Toolik Lake.  We break these down by vegetation type, including Moist acidic tussock tundra, Moist nonacidic tussock tundra, moist nonacidic nontussock tundra, dry heath tundra, wet sedge tundra, and deciduous shrub tundra.  Much of the data on these sites is available at the ARC LTER web site at:  http://ecosystems.mbl.edu/arc/  

Date site was established: 1976  

Does your site have OTC's? Yes  OTCs (1982) and Fertilizer (1982), Herbivory exclosure (1996), Vegetation removal (1995), Shade treatments

When were they established?  Dates above are dates of first expt, new experiments with same treatments established at various dates in the 1980s-2000s                                                                                    

Have they been closed? If so, when? No

Is there grazing at your site?  Insects, Ungulates, Rodents, Birds  

Climate data:Air temperature >1m, Soil temperature, Snow depth, Snowmelt date, Precipitation, Cloud cover, PAR, Wind speed, Wind direction, Soil moisture probe, Soil moisture (% water by weight), Active layer depth, Solar radiation, UV

Current or past data collection:  Plot level phenology, Individual plant phenology, Point framing, Above ground plant traits, Below ground plant traits, Flower counts (total), Flower counts (per stage), Plot photos, Transplant experiments, Below ground microbe surveys, Multispectral data, Above ground invertebrates, Below ground invertebrates, CO2 Flux, Methane Flux, Plant abundance measure (other than point framing), Lichen cover, Bryophyte cover, Plant tissue nutrient composition, Above ground biomass harvest, Below ground biomass harvest, Litter bags, Soil (physical texture), Soil (chemical nutrient composition), Lots of soil chemistry, plant allometry and vegetative and sexual demography    Fine-scale geospatial data (GPS points for each plot), Multispectral data, Common garden experiment, Reciprocal transplant experiment

Note: Many protocols established before ITEX; some ITEX protocols developed from ours  

Main genera in OTC plots:  Dryas, Salix, Betula, Cassiope, Vaccinium, Empetrum, Rhododendron, Carex, Eriophorum, Festuca, Poa, Juncus, Saxifraga, Silene, Cerastium, Stellaria, Papaver, Oxyria, Draba, Cardamine, Equisetum, Lycopodium, Ferns, Bryophytes, Lichen, Astragalus, Oxytropis, Rubus, Above checked spp occur at >50% occurrence at at least one local site but none at every site

Toolik Lake, Alaska (Gough) 
Name of site leader(s): Laura Gough, Ed Rastetter, Donie Bret-Harte

University: MBL Woods Hole, University of Alaska, Towson University

Site elevation: 730 m

Latitude (WGS84 decimal degrees): 68 deg 38 min N

Longitude (WGS84 decimal degrees): 149 deg 34 min W

Date site was established: 1976

Does your site have OTC's? No

Number of plots at your site (include OTCs control plots, etc.) hundreds

When were they established? 1976-2006

Have they been closed? If so, when?

Is there grazing at your site? Yes

Climate data: Air temperature, Soil temperature, Snow depth, Precipitation, Cloud cover, PAR, radiation balance, uv

Current or past data collection: Phenology, Point framing, Above ground plant traits, Below ground traits, Herbivory, Flower counts, Plot photos, Snow fences, Snow addition and removal, Fertilizer plots, Snowmelt dates, Soil moisture, GIS data, Soil sampling, NPP GPP, bulk CNP stocks and turnover

Main genera in OTC plots: Salix, Betula, Cassiope, Vaccinium, Sedges, Grasses, Rushes, Mosses/Lichens, NO OTCs—plastic greenhouses. 5 contrasting veg types

Alaska Ecotypes/Alaska Eriophorum vaginatum Transplant Garden 
Name of site leader(s):  Ned Fetcher 2014–present, Jim Tang 2014-present, Michael Moody 2014–present  

University: Wilkes University, Marine Biological Laboratory, University of Texas - El Paso

This is a reciprocal transplant experiment using three populations, Sagwon, Toolik, Lake, and Coldfoot. Each plot contains three tussocks of Eriophorum vaginatum that were transplanted in August 2014. At Sagwon and Toolik Lake, half of the plots had OTC's beginning in July 2015.

Toolik Lake 
Site elevation: 763 m

Latitude (WGS84 decimal degrees):  68.62886

Longitude (WGS84 decimal degrees):  -149.576521

Date site was established: 2011, 2014

Does your site have OTC's? Currently have

Number of plots at your site (include OTCs control plots, etc.) 72

When were they established? 24 in 2011, 48 in 2014

Have they been closed? If so, when?

Is there grazing at your site? No

Climate data: Air temperature 10 cm, Air temperature >1m, Soil temperature, Snow depth, Snowmelt date, Precipitation, Cloud cover, PAR, Wind speed, Wind direction, Active layer depth, Solar radiation, Data available from Toolik Field Station website  

Current or past data collection:  Individual plant phenology, Snapshot phenology, Above ground plant traits, Below ground plant traits, Flower counts (total), Plot photos, Phenocams (GoPros etc.), Transplant experiments, CO2 Flux, Litter bags    Fine-scale geospatial data (GPS points for each plot), Drone images, Phenocams of site (GoPros etc.), Common garden experiment, Reciprocal transplant experiment

Main genera in OTC plots:  Salix, Betula, Cassiope, Vaccinium, Empetrum, Rhododendron, Carex, Eriophorum, Bryophytes, Lichen, Rubus

Sagwon 
Site elevation: 297m

Latitude (WGS84 decimal degrees): 69.4239

Longitude (WGS84 decimal degrees): -148.7008  

Date site was established: 2014

Does your site have OTC's? Currently have

Number of plots at your site (include OTCs control plots, etc.) 48

When were they established? 2015  

Have they been closed? If so, when?

Is there grazing at your site? No

Climate data:  Air temperature >1m, Soil temperature, Snow depth, Snowmelt date, Precipitation, Wind speed, Wind direction, Solar radiation, Data is available from USDA SNOTEL website

Current or past data collection:  Individual plant phenology, Above ground plant traits, Below ground plant traits, Plot photos, Transplant experiments, Litter bags    Fine-scale geospatial data (GPS points for each plot), Common garden experiment, Reciprocal transplant experiment

Main genera in OTC plots: Salix, Betula, Vaccinium, Rhododendron, Carex, Eriophorum, Bryophytes, Lichen, Rubus

Coldfoot 
Site elevation: 320 m

Latitude (WGS84 decimal degrees): 67.2586

Longitude (WGS84 decimal degrees): -150.1698

Date site was established: 2014

Does your site have OTC's? Never had

Number of plots at your site (include OTCs control plots, etc.) 24

When were they established? 2014

Have they been closed? If so, when? NA

Is there grazing at your site? No

Climate data: Air temperature >1m, Soil temperature, Snow depth, Snowmelt date, Precipitation, Wind speed, Wind direction, Solar radiation, Data are available from the USDA-SNOTEL website.

Current or past data collection: Individual plant phenology, Above ground plant traits, Plot photos, Litter bags    Fine-scale geospatial data (GPS points for each plot), Common garden experiment, Reciprocal transplant experiment

Main genera in OTC plots: Salix, Betula, Vaccinium, Rhododendron, Carex, Eriophorum, Bryophytes, Lichen, Rubus

Toolik Lake (Welker and Oberbauer) 
Name of site leader(s): Jeffrey M Welker and Steven F Oberbauer

University: Florida International University

Toolik Moist     
Site elevation:  720 m

Latitude (WGS84 decimal degrees):   68.62

Longitude (WGS84 decimal degrees): -149.603  

Date site was established:  1994    

Does your site have OTC's?   Yes    OTCs, Snow fences  

When were they established? 1994

Toolik Dry     
Site elevation:   720 m

Latitude (WGS84 decimal degrees):  68.62  

Longitude (WGS84 decimal degrees):  -149.598

Date site was established: 1994

Does your site have OTC's? Yes    OTCs, Snow fences  

When were they established? 1994

Toolik Snowfield     
Latitude (WGS84 decimal degrees):  68.62

Longitude (WGS84 decimal degrees):   -149.601            

Does your site have OTC's? Yes  OTCs

Imnaviat Creek, Alaska 
Name of site leader(s): Jeremy May and Steven Oberbauer

University: Florida International University

Dry Heath 
Site elevation: 927m asl

Latitude (WGS84 decimal degrees): 68 37' N

Longitude (WGS84 decimal degrees): 149 18' W

Date site was established: 2016

Does your site have OTC's? Currently have

Number of plots at your site (include OTCs control plots, etc.) 16

When were they established? June 2016

Have they been closed? If so, when? No

Is there grazing at your site? No

Climate data: No

Current or past data collection: Point framing, Plot photos, NDVI

Main genera in OTC plots: Dryas, Salix, Betula, Cassiope, Vaccinium, Sedges, Grasses, Saxifraga, Mosses/Lichens

Wet Acidic 
Site elevation: 927 m asl

Latitude (WGS84 decimal degrees): 68 37' N

Longitude (WGS84 decimal degrees): 149 18' W

Date site was established: 2016

Does your site have OTC's? Currently have

Number of plots at your site (include OTCs control plots, etc.) 16

When were they established? June 2016

Have they been closed? If so, when? No

Is there grazing at your site? No

Climate data: No

Current or past data collection: Point framing, Plot photos, NDVI

Main genera in OTC plots: Salix, Betula, Cassiope, Vaccinium, Sedges, Grasses, Saxifraga, Mosses/Lichens

Alaska Ice Cut 
Name of site leader(s): Ellen Dorrepaal

University: Umeå University

Site elevation: 385 m asl

Latitude (WGS84 decimal degrees): N69°048'

Longitude (WGS84 decimal degrees): W148°836'

Date site was established: 2014

Does your site have OTC's? Currently have

Number of plots at your site (include OTCs control plots, etc.) 24

When were they established? 2014 (snow fences), 2016 (OTCs)

Have they been closed? If so, when? NA

Is there grazing at your site? No

Climate data: Air temperature, Soil temperature, Snow depth, Thaw depth; Soil moisture

Current or past data collection: Point framing, Above ground plant traits, Snow fences, Soil moisture, Drones, NDVI; Ecosystem Respiration; GPP

Main genera in OTC plots: Salix, Betula, Vaccinium, Sedges, Mosses/Lichens, Ledum,  Rubus

White Mountains 

Name of site leader(s):Christopher Kopp  

University:University of British Columbia

Fellfield               
Site elevation:  3100 m 

Latitude (WGS84 decimal degrees):  37.5

Longitude (WGS84 decimal degrees): -118.17

Date site was established: 2013    

Does your site have OTC's? No

Shrubland        
Site elevation: 3700 m

Latitude (WGS84 decimal degrees):     37.5

Longitude (WGS84 decimal degrees): -118.17

Date site was established:   2013    

Does your site have OTC's?  No

Niwot Ridge 

Name of site leader(s):Sarah Elmendorf

University:   University of Colorado, Boulder

Dry Fellfield                             
Site elevation:   3535 m 

Latitude (WGS84 decimal degrees):  40.0548849

Longitude (WGS84 decimal degrees):  -105.5880266  

Does your site have OTC's?  No

Dry Meadow                   
Site elevation: 3529  m

Latitude (WGS84 decimal degrees): 40.0554251  

Longitude (WGS84 decimal degrees): -105.5888966  

Does your site have OTC's?  No

Moist Meadow                
Site elevation:  3525 m 

Latitude (WGS84 decimal degrees):  40.05473969

Longitude (WGS84 decimal degrees):  -105.5901614  

Does your site have OTC's? No

Moist Shrub Tundra                  
Site elevation: 3528 m

Latitude (WGS84 decimal degrees): 40.05619788

Longitude (WGS84 decimal degrees):  -105.589602   

Does your site have OTC's?     Yes

Snowbed                                 
Site elevation: 3537 m

Latitude (WGS84 decimal degrees): 40.0569184

Longitude (WGS84 decimal degrees): -105.5908668

Does your site have OTC's?  No

Snow Fence                     
Site elevation: 3524 m  

Latitude (WGS84 decimal degrees): 40.05659895

Longitude (WGS84 decimal degrees): -105.5895581     

Does your site have OTC's?   No

Southern hemisphere sites

Antarctica 
Name of site leader(s): Nicoletta Cannone

University: Università dell'Insubria

Edmonson Point 
Site elevation: 5–35 m  

Latitude (WGS84 decimal degrees): 74°19'S

Longitude (WGS84 decimal degrees): 165°08'E

Date site was established: 2014

Does your site have OTC's? No, but it does have precipitation shields, nutrient additions, and long-term monitoring without manipulations

Number of plots at your site (include OTCs control plots, etc.) 88

When were they established? 2014

Have they been closed? If so, when?  No

Is there grazing at your site? No

Climate data: Soil temperature

Current or past data collection: Point framing, Plot photos, Snow fences, Fertilizer plots, Snowmelt dates, Soil sampling, Vegetation coverage and floristic composition

Main genera in OTC plots: Mosses/Lichens

Finger Point 
Site elevation: 50m

Latitude (WGS84 decimal degrees):  77°00'S

Longitude (WGS84 decimal degrees): 162°26'E

Date site was established:         2014

Does your site have OTC's? No, but it does have precipitation shields, nutrient additions, and long-term monitoring without manipulations

Number of plots at your site (include OTCs control plots, etc.) 36

When were they established? 2014

Have they been closed? If so, when?  No ongoing experiment

Is there grazing at your site? No             

Climate data: Air temperature, Soil temperature

Current or past data collection: Point framing, Plot photos, Snow fences, Fertilizer plots, Snowmelt dates, Soil sampling, vegetation coverage and floristic composition

Main genera in OTC plots: Mosses/Lichens

Apostrophe Island 
Site elevation: 50m

Latitude (WGS84 decimal degrees):  73°31'S

Longitude (WGS84 decimal degrees): 167°25'E

Date site was established:         2014

Does your site have OTC's? No, but it does have precipitation shields, nutrient additions, and long-term monitoring

Number of plots at your site (include OTCs control plots, etc.) 36

When were they established? 2014

Have they been closed? If so, when?  No, ongoing experiment              

Is there grazing at your site? No            

Climate data: Air temperature, Soil temperature

Current or past data collection: Point framing, Plot photos, Snow fences, Fertilizer plots, Snowmelt dates, Soil sampling, vegetation coverage and floristic composition

Main genera in OTC plots: Mosses/Lichens

Tarn Flat 
Site elevation: 20m

Latitude (WGS84 decimal degrees):  74°59'S     

Longitude (WGS84 decimal degrees): 162°37'E

Date site was established:         2014

Does your site have OTC's? No, but it does have precipitation shields, nutrient additions, and long-term monitoring

Number of plots at your site (include OTCs control plots, etc.) 36

When were they established? 2014

Have they been closed? If so, when?  No, ongoing experiment

Is there grazing at your site? No              

Climate data: Soil temperature

Current or past data collection: Point framing, Plot photos, Snow fences, Fertilizer plots, Snowmelt dates, Soil sampling, vegetation coverage and floristic composition

Main genera in OTC plots: Mosses/Lichens

Boulder Clay 
Site elevation: 150 m                    

Latitude (WGS84 decimal degrees):  74°44'S

Longitude (WGS84 decimal degrees): 164°01'E

Date site was established:         2014

Does your site have OTC's? No, but it does have precipitation shields, nutrient additions, and long-term monitoring

Number of plots at your site (include OTCs control plots, etc.) 36

When were they established? 2014

Have they been closed? If so, when?  No, ongoing experiment

Is there grazing at your site? No              

Climate data: Air temperature, Soil temperature, Snow depth

Current or past data collection: Point framing, Plot photos, Snow fences, Fertilizer plots, Snowmelt dates, Soil sampling, vegetation coverage and floristic composition

Main genera in OTC plots: Mosses/Lichens

Falkland Islands 
Name of site leader(s): Stef Bokhorst (previously R. Aerts, P. Convey and A. Huiskes (all in 2003))

University:  VU Amsterdam

Site elevation:   2 m

Latitude (WGS84 decimal degrees):  -51.76  

Longitude (WGS84 decimal degrees):  -59.03

Date site was established: 2003  

Does your site have OTC's? Yes  

Number of plots at your site (include OTCs control plots, etc.) 24  

When were they established?  2003  

Have they been closed? If so, when? No

Is there grazing at your site?  Birds  

Climate data: No    full monitoring only during 2003-2005  

Current or past data collection:   Point framing, Plot photos, Litter bags, Soil (chemical nutrient composition)

Main genera in OTC plots: Empetrum, Ferns, Bryophytes, Lichen

Anchorage Island 
Name of site leader(s): Stef Bokhorst  (previously R. Aerts, P. Convey and A. Huiskes)

University:  VU Amsterdam  

Site elevation: 30 m

Latitude (WGS84 decimal degrees):  -67.61

Longitude (WGS84 decimal degrees):  -68.22  

Date site was established: 2004

Does your site have OTC's? Yes OTCs and Fertilizer (2015)

Number of plots at your site (include OTCs control plots, etc.) 12  

When were they established?  2004

Have they been closed? If so, when? No

Is there grazing at your site? No

Climate data:Air temperature >1m, Wind speed, Wind direction, Solar radiation, Soil temperature, full soil temp, PAR and rel hum during 2004-2007

Current or past data collection: Point framing, Plot photos, Below ground microbe surveys, Multispectral data, Below ground invertebrates, CO2 Flux, Lichen cover, Bryophyte cover, Soil (chemical nutrient composition)    Taxonomic classification of lichens, Taxonomic classification of bryophytes

Main genera in OTC plots:  Bryophytes, Lichen  

 Yes      Yes, but infrequently (once 3–5 years)    No        Yes, year round

Reserva Ecológica Antisana 
Name of site leader(s): Priscilla Muriel, Francisco Cuesta

University: Pontificia Universidad Católica del Ecuador

Site elevation: 4580 m

Latitude (WGS84 decimal degrees): 0°28'1.50"S

Longitude (WGS84 decimal degrees): 78° 9'43.00"W

Date site was established: August 2013

Does your site have OTC's? Yes

Number of plots at your site (include OTCs control plots, etc.) 25 control plots, 25 OTC plots (2013), 7 OTC+phenology plots and 7 corresponding control plots (2017)

When were they established? August 2013

Have they been closed? If so, when?  No

Is there grazing at your site? Yes

Climate data: Air temperature, Soil temperature, This summer 2018 we will install a station with precipitation, radiation (PAR), soil water content

Current or past data collection: Phenology, Above ground plant traits, Flower counts, Plot photos, Planned: soil sampling, herbivory

Main genera in OTC plots: Páramo (tropical alpine vegetation) species

See also
 International Polar Year
 Global warming

References

Climate change and the environment
Arctic research
Climatological research